The Cayman National Cultural Foundation (CNCF) is the official arts council for the Cayman Islands. It was founded in 1984.

The Cayman National Cultural Foundation manages the F.J. Harquail Cultural Centre and the US$4 million Harquail Theatre.

External links
 Cayman National Cultural Foundation Homepage

Arts councils
Cultural organisations based in the Cayman Islands
1984 establishments in the United Kingdom
Organizations established in 1984
Arts in the Cayman Islands